"The Blind Geometer" is a 1986 science fiction story by American writer Kim Stanley Robinson. It was published by Asimov's Science Fiction.

Plot summary

Carlos Nevsky is a blind professor of solid geometry who discovers that his new colleagues are manipulating him for sinister purposes.

Reception
"The Blind Geometer" won the Nebula Award for Best Novella in 1987, and was a finalist for the 1988 Hugo Award for Best Novella.

The Los Angeles Review of Books considered that the story "amply demonstrates Robinson’s hard-SF credentials". Strange Horizons, however, felt that it was "ambitious but awkward", with an "uneven mix of perceptual philosophy and conspiracy thriller."

References

Works originally published in Asimov's Science Fiction
Fictional blind characters
Nebula Award for Best Novella-winning works
1980s science fiction works
1986 works